Francis Alfred Ernest Dowsing (10 November 1882 – 14 March 1963) was an Australian rules footballer who played for the South Melbourne Football Club in the Victorian Football League (VFL).

Notes

External links 

1882 births
1963 deaths
Australian rules footballers from Adelaide
Sydney Swans players